The Message of the Mouse is a 1917 American silent drama film directed by J. Stuart Blackton, written by Edward J. Montagne, George Randolph Chester, and Lillian Chester.  The film stars Anita Stewart, Julia Swayne Gordon, and Rudolph Cameron.

Cast list

References

American silent feature films
1917 films
1917 drama films
American black-and-white films
Films directed by J. Stuart Blackton
Silent American drama films
Vitagraph Studios films
1910s English-language films
1910s American films